Eupithecia longifimbria is a moth in the  family Geometridae. It is found in Brazil.

References

External links

Moths described in 1897
longifimbria
Moths of South America